U. S. Post Office and Federal Building is a historic post office building located at Rockingham, Richmond County, North Carolina.  It was designed by the Office of the Supervising Architect under Louis A. Simon and built in 1935–1936.  It is a two-story, five bay, yellow brick veneer building in the Art Deco style.  It features a 1937 Works Progress Administration mural titled "Human Aspects of the Postal Service" ·by artist Edward Lanning in the front lobby.  The building was occupied by the Rockingham Post Office until 1977 when it was purchased by Richmond County from the United States Postal Service.

It was listed on the National Register of Historic Places in 1983.

References

Federal buildings in the United States
Works Progress Administration in North Carolina
Rockingham
Art Deco architecture in North Carolina
Government buildings completed in 1936
Buildings and structures in Randolph County, North Carolina
National Register of Historic Places in Richmond County, North Carolina